Richard W. Reading (February 7, 1882 – December 9, 1952) was a Republican mayor of Detroit, Michigan from 1938 to 1940.

Biography
Richard William Reading was born in Detroit on February 7, 1882, the son of Richard W. and Louise M. Reading.  He was educated in the Detroit Public Schools and attended the University of Detroit.

Reading married Blanche White in 1901.  The couple had four children.

Reading was for a time a semi-pro wrestler.  He later worked variously as a printer, a newspaper executive, and a real estate dealer before entering public life in 1921.

Reading was appointed City Assessor in 1921, moved to City Controller in 1924, and was elected City Clerk in 1926.  He stayed in the office of clerk until 1939, when he ran for mayor, ultimately defeating Patrick H. O'Brien by nearly two-to-one.  However, once in the office, Reading engaged in graft, selling protection to  numbers racketeers and promotions to police officers.  This corruption was exposed as the campaign for the next mayoral election was gearing up, and Reading was crushed by Edward Jeffries.

Shortly after leaving office, Reading was indicted on charges of accepting bribes and conspiring to protect Detroit's gambling rackets.  He was sentenced to four to five years in prison, of which he served three.

Richard W. Reading died on December 9, 1952, in Brighton, Michigan.

References

External links

1882 births
1952 deaths
Mayors of Detroit
University of Detroit Mercy alumni
20th-century American politicians
Michigan Republicans